Bräkneån is a river in southern Smaland and Blekinge, Sweden, which runs through Tingsryd and Ronneby municipalities. Bräkneån from Fish Lake City ( AMSL) in southern Småland, Tingsryd, Kronoberg County, and winds about four miles to the lake Ygden in the south ( AMSL). From Ygden go Bräkneån via Tingsryd to the lake Tiken ( AMSL) and then reaches Blekinge. (A rest stop at Bräkneån found along Highway 29, just before the Bay Area). In Blekinge passed including the village Bälganet and agglomeration Bräkne-Hoby at E22 before Bräkneån eventually flows into the Baltic Sea at Väby.

A film about Bräkneån and people in the river valley was shown on BBC1 in early 2004.

References

Rivers of Kronoberg County